Choës (Greek: Χοές) is the name of a studio album by Greek-Cypriot composer and producer Giorgos Theofanous. It was released on 29 March 2015 by Radio Proto in a special edition as a covermount with the Sunday edition of the Cypriot newspaper Simerini in Cyprus, on the occasion of the 60th Anniversary of the EOKA Cyprus Liberation Struggle (1955 - 1959).

The album includes poems by the Cypriot poet and former Minister of Education and Culture of Cyprus Claire Angelides about the heroes of EOKA, that were set to music by Giorgos Theofanous and interpreted by Greek popular singers Marinella, Kostas Makedonas and Dimos Anastasiadis. The presentation of the album was held at the Imprisoned Graves, in the presence of the President of the Republic of Cyprus Nicos Anastasiades, on 27 March 2015.

Track listing 
 "Fones iroon" (Φωνές ηρώων; Heroes' voices) – 2:32
 "I iroes" (Οι ήρωες; The heroes) – 3:06
 "Dio Despines (Markos Drakos)" (Δυο Δέσποινες; Two Despinas) – 4:20
 "Simeoforos (Petrakis Giallouros)" (Σημαιοφόρος; Standard bearer) – 3:22
 "I istoria tou, mikri (Andreas Paraskevas)" (Η ιστορία του, μικρή; His story was short) – 3:08
 "Zeibekiko (Andreas Panayidis)" (Ζεϊμπέκικο) – 3:31
 "Stous Tesseris tou Achirona (Andreas Karyos, Elias Papakyriakou, Fotis Pittas, Christos Samaras)" (Στους Τέσσερις του Αχυρώνα; Dedicated to the Four of Achirona) – 4:50
 "Charontas (Michalis Karaolis)" (Χάροντας; Charon) – 3:08
 "O megalos nekros mas (Michalakis Paridis)" (Ο μεγάλος νεκρός μας; Our Great dead) – 3:09
 "Mana (Loukia Papageorgiou)" (Μάνα; Mother) – 4:45
 "Louloudas (Dimitrakis Dimitriou)" (Λουδουδάς; Florist) – 3:17
 "Beethoven (Andreas Zakos)" (Μπετόβεν) – 2:35
 "Esy anevikes ta skalopatia… (Evagoras Pallikaridis)" (Εσύ ανέβηκες τα σκαλοπάτια; You have climbed the stairs) – 4:50
 "Defte lavete Fos" (Δεύτε λάβετε Φως; Come receive the Light) – 3:22

Credits and personnel

Personnel
 Marinella - vocals on tracks 1, 2, 7 and 10
 Kostas Makedonas - vocals on tracks 3, 4, 6, 8 and 13, background vocals on track "Stous Tesseris tou Achirona"
 Dimos Anastasiadis - vocals on tracks 5, 9 and 12
 Giorgis Tsouris - narrative
 Marina Verzanli - vocals on track "Louloudas"
 Evangelos Drouzas - vocals on track "Defte lavete Fos", background vocals
 Konstantinos Papachristodoulou, Georgios Vlachopoulos, Apostolos Kalpakidis, Georgios Romiliotis - background vocals
 Giorgos Theofanous - piano
 Leonidas Tzitzos - keyboard
 Giannis Grigoriou - bass
 Grigoris Syntridis - drums, percussion
 Phoebus Zacharopoulos - guitar
 Stavros Papagiannopoulos - bouzouki, baglamas
 Michalis Porfiris - cello
 Alexandros Arkadopoulos - wind
 Hercules Vavatsikas - accordion

Production and design
 Giorgos Theofanous - producer
 Leonidas Tzitzos - arranger and conductor
 Ilias Lakkas - recording engineer in the studio "Odeon"
 Babis Mpiris - recording engineer in the studio "Bikay"
 Nikolas Ntimas - recording engineer on track "Louloudas"
 Giota Efthimiou - artwork

Credits adapted from the album's liner notes.

References

2015 albums
Giorgos Theofanous albums
Albums produced by Giorgos Theofanous
Greek-language albums